Villamontán de la Valduerna is a municipality located in the province of León, Castile and León, Spain. According to the 2008 census (INE), the municipality has a population of 941 inhabitants.  In addition to Villamontán, the municipality includes the villages of Fresno de la Valduerna, Miñambres de la Valduerna, Posada de la Valduerna, Redelga de la Valduerna, Valle de la Valduerna and Villalís de la Valduerna.

References

Municipalities in the Province of León
Tierra de La Bañeza